is a district of Chiyoda, Tokyo, Japan, consisting three chōme. Its population was 833 as of April 1, 2007. Its postal code is 101-0061.

Kanda-Misakichō is located on the northern part of Chiyoda Ward. It borders Kōraku and Hongō, Bunkyō to the north; Kanda-Sarugakuchō, Chiyoda to the east; Nishi-Kanda, Chiyoda to the south; and Iidabashi, Chiyoda to the west.

Economy
Holp Shuppan is headquartered in Misakichō.

Education

Primary and secondary education

 operates public elementary and junior high schools. Ochanomizu Elementary School (お茶の水小学校) is the zoned elementary school for Kanda-Misakichō 1-3 chōme. There is a freedom of choice system for junior high schools in Chiyoda Ward, and so there are no specific junior high school zones.

, a private high school, is in Kanda-Misakichō 1-chōme.

Tertiary education
 Kanda-Misakichō 1-chōme
Nihon University College of Economics (Main Building)
Kanda-Misakichō 2-chōme
Nihon University College of Law (Main, 2nd, 3rd, 4th and 5th Building)
Nihon University College of Economics (7th Building)
Nihon University Correspondence Division (Main Building)
Tokyo Dental College
LEC Tokyo Legal Mind University
Kanda-Misakichō 3-chōme
RINRI Institute of Ethics

References

External links
 Rename of Sarugakucho and Misakicho - Chiyoda City 

Districts of Chiyoda, Tokyo